Phractura gladysae is a species of catfish in the genus Phractura. It is found in the upper Louesse River in the Republic of the Congo. It has a length of 14 cm.

References 

gladysae
Freshwater fish of Africa
Fish described in 1932
Taxa named by Jacques Pellegrin